Celeste Barber (born 6 May 1982) is an Australian comedian and media personality.

Early life 
Celeste was born and raised in Australia, and grew up in the city of Sydney for most of her life. She has a sister.

Celeste attended Saint Joseph's College, Tweed Heads. In the early 2000s, she trained in acting in Nepean, Sydney.

Career

Acting 

Barber has appeared in various television shows but is perhaps best known for her role of paramedic Bree Matthews in the TV show All Saints and for her roles in Office Correctness and How Not to Behave.
Barber was a sketch writer/performer on The Matty Johns Show. She was also part of a film called Burke & Wills which went on to become a finalist at the 2006 Tribeca film festival. She has been a panellist on Have You Been Paying Attention? and also was a co-host on Studio 10.

Comedy 

Although Celeste started out in acting, she later fell into comedy. Barber states: "I've always been told I've been funny but I always thought funny was stupid. I thought if you were a bit of an idiot then that was funny. But I've since learnt, no, not the case, and being funny is the best and I love it… My late friend Mark Priestley, who worked on All Saints with me, was like, "This is your niche," and he helped me focus on it.

In 2015 she was a MICF Raw Comedy state finalist and sold out shows for both the Sydney Comedy and Fringe Festivals.

Writing 

Celeste released her first book, Celeste Barber – Challenge Accepted in September 2018. It's described by Barber as "253 Steps to becoming an anti-it girl". Barber's second book was a children's book titled Celeste the Giraffe Loves to Laugh and it was published in October 2019.

Her third book, Flamingo Celeste is Not like the Rest, illustrated by Heath McKenzie and published in 2021, was shortlisted for the picture book prize at the 2022 West Australian Young Readers' Book Awards.

Instagram 

In Early January 2015, the earliest instances of Barber recreating photos of celebrities and famous women began to emerge on her Instagram. Celeste and her sister would send each other text messages back and forth of how women are supposed to do everyday activities and they began to poke fun at the depiction.

In September 2018, Barber was featured in comedy videos released by Tom Ford. The three videos, posted to Celeste and Ford's respective Instagram accounts, show Ford teaching Barber how to walk in his shows, while she attempts to sneak some of the clothes home in her bag. The video played at the after party of Ford's show, which opened New York Fashion Week. The videos come after the pair collaborated on a previous comedy video featuring Ford and Celeste vigorously making out in an airport terminal.

Fundraising 

During the devastating 2019–20 Australian bushfire season Barber launched a fundraising appeal with a target of raising A$15,000 for the New South Wales Rural Fire Service's RFS Brigades Donation Fund. The fundraiser went on to raise over A$50 million, making it the largest ever held on Facebook. After the money was raised, Celeste learned that the RFS Fund was by law restricted to training, resources and equipment, and could not be redirected to communities. The RFS and Barber's legal team worked together to find a way to disburse the funds more widely. In May 2020, the Supreme Court ruled that the funds could not go to other charities.

Other work 

Barber started her own podcast in April 2019 titled Celeste.

Personal life 
Celeste lives on the Gold Coast with her husband Api Robin and their two sons. She is also a step-mother to two girls.

Filmography

Television

Film 
Back to the Outback – Skylar (voice)

References

External links 

1982 births
Living people
Australian television actresses
Actresses from Sydney
Australian television personalities
Women television personalities
Australian women comedians
Comedians from Sydney
21st-century Australian women writers
21st-century Australian writers
Writers from Sydney
Australian women podcasters
Australian podcasters
21st-century Australian comedians
21st-century Australian actresses